Faslah is a 1974 Bollywood drama film directed by Khwaja Ahmad Abbas. The film stars Raman Khanna.

Cast
Raman Khanna as Gautam Swarup Chandra
Shabana Azmi as Asha Premchand
Nadira as Mrs. Sonachand
Paintal
Yunus Parvez as Editor
P. Jairaj
Vinod Mehra as Vinod (Gautam's Friend)
Imtiaz Khan as Gopal 'Gogi'
Komilla Wirk
David Abraham as Sharma (as David)
Shaukat Azmi as Parvati S. Chandra (as Shaukat Kaifi)
Manmauji
Moolchand as Phoolchand - Prison inmate (as Mulchand)
Dinesh Thakur as Comrade Kranti - Prison inmate
Chand Usmani as Radha Chandra
Vijay Ganju as Advocate Bakshi
Helen as Dancer / Singer at Club

Soundtrack

External links
 

1974 films
1970s Hindi-language films
1974 drama films
Films directed by K. A. Abbas